The name Gamma has been used for two tropical cyclones in the Atlantic Ocean.

 Tropical Storm Gamma (2005), a late season tropical storm that produced locally heavy rainfall and flooding in Honduras and Belize.
 Hurricane Gamma (2020), a Category 1 hurricane that brought heavy rains, floods, and landslides to the Yucatán Peninsula.

Atlantic hurricane set index articles